Vuillafans is a commune in the Doubs department in the Bourgogne-Franche-Comté region in eastern France.

Personalities
It was the birthplace of Balthasar Gérard, the assassin of the Dutch independence leader, William I of Orange, also known as William the Silent. Gérard was born at number 3 in the street now called Rue Gérard.

Population

See also
Communes of the Doubs department
 Philippe François Zéphirin Guillemin (1814-1886), Roman Catholic bishop, was born in Vuillafans

References

Communes of Doubs